Zizzo is a surname. Notable people with the surname include:

Anthony Zizzo (1935–disappeared 2006), American mobster
Peter Zizzo (born 1966), American songwriter, music producer, musician and writer
Sal Zizzo (born 1987), American soccer player

See also
Rizzo (surname)
Zazzo